The 1990–91 season was the 89th in the history of the Western Football League.

The league champions for the first time in their history were Mangotsfield United. The champions of Division One were Minehead after finishing bottom the previous season.

Final tables

Premier Division
The Premier Division remained at 21 clubs after Swanage Town & Herston transferred to the Wessex League. One club joined:

Ottery St Mary, champions of the First Division.

First Division
The First Division was increased from 20 clubs to 21, after Ottery St Mary were promoted to the Premier Division. Two new clubs joined:

Crediton United, promoted from the Devon & Exeter League.
Torquay United Reserves, rejoining after leaving the league in 1982.

References

1990-91
6